George Earle (born 9 January 1987) is a South African rugby union footballer. His regular playing position is lock.

Earle represented the Cheetahs in Super Rugby and the Griquas in the Currie Cup having previously played for Western Province, Boland Cavaliers and the Golden Lions. In May 2012 he signed for the Welsh regional team the Scarlets for the 2012–2013 season.

In 2016 Earle received an 8 week ban, following a red card for 'making contact with [the] eye' playing Bath in the European Rugby Challenge Cup. Earle appealed the ban, but the committee upheld it.

On 7 April 2016, Earle signed for Pro 14 rivals Cardiff Blues ahead of the 2016-17 season. He subsequently signed a new deal to stay with Cardiff until the end of the 2018-19 season. 

On 6 May 2019, Earle left Cardiff to sign for Pro D2 side Colomiers in France ahead of the 2019-20 season.

References

External links 

itsrugby.co.uk profile

1987 births
Living people
Boland Cavaliers players
Cheetahs (rugby union) players
Golden Lions players
Griquas (rugby union) players
Lions (United Rugby Championship) players
Rugby union locks
Rugby union players from Durban
Scarlets players
South African people of British descent
South African rugby union players
Western Province (rugby union) players
White South African people